Spreckels Temple of Music, also called the bandshell, constructed in 1900, is in the Music Concourse at Golden Gate Park in San Francisco. It was a gift to the city from sugar magnate Claus Spreckels and is one of the largest bandshells in  North America.

History

The Spreckels Temple of Music was the third bandstand in the park. The first was built in 1882, and a larger one was built 1888. In 1895, discussions began about building a larger bandshell to accommodate the "Sunday and holiday crowds." Adolph B. Spreckels, president of the San Francisco Park Commission, convinced his father, sugar magnate Claus Spreckels, founder of the Spreckels Sugar Company, to pay for it. Spreckels spent $75,000 towards the $78,810 cost of the building.

The new bandstand was dedicated as a gift to the people of California on Admission Day, September 9, 1900, in celebration of the 50th anniversary of the state's admission to the Union. 75,000 people attended celebration in the Golden Gate Park. Spreckels and General W. H. L. Barnes stepped into the music stand to address the people. Spreckels gave a speech about his gratitude for the benefits he received as an immigrant and that he had chosen to build a bandstand because music was uplifting and should be '"rendered free to all." 

 

Construction began in 1899, before the completion of the Music Concourse in 1900. It was designed by architects Reid & Reid. The building shell is an Italian Renaissance style with an acoustically reflective coffered shell standing 70 feet high and covered in Colusa sandstone. The two relief sculptures are by sculptor Robert Ingersoll Aitken. The one on the left holds a lyre and the one on the right a trumpet. The platform is 45 feet wide and 80 feet high and can accommodate 100 musicians. It is one of the largest bandshells in the North America.

The pavilion was severely damaged in the 1906 San Francisco earthquake. Much of its Colusa sandstone, cornices, balustrades, and corners collapsed. Architect Reid estimated the damage and cost of restoring it at $15,000. After the Loma Prieta earthquake, restoration was done by architects Cary and Company. At that time, FEMA and the Office of Emergency Services spent $3.1 million on seismic upgrades.

Today
The bandshell has served as a stage for numerous performers over the years ranging from John Philip Sousa to Luciano Pavarotti and the Grateful Dead. The Temple of Music is the home of the Golden Gate Park Band, that has done 139 years of free public concerts in the Golden Gate Park and provides free concerts most Sundays each year. The bandshell often draws 10,000 to 20,000 listeners. The pavilion has been the place for annual celebrations of the anniversary of the Polish Constitution of May 3, 1791.

Daily commercial fees to use the bandshell are $3,538; non-profit 501(c)3 entities $1,769; capacity is 500. Parking is available in an underground parking structure at the park. Hours are limited to 5 consecutive hours and no sound before 9 a.m.

Gallery

See also
 Golden Gate Park
 Music Concourse

References

External links
 Spreckels Temple of Music

1900 establishments in California
Amphitheaters in California
Music venues in San Francisco
Golden Gate Park
Reid & Reid buildings